Songs in the Key of Kids is the 12th album by popular children's entertainers Sharon, Lois & Bram, originally released in 1993. This album is a compilation album containing songs from their original records. It was also the first "new" release under Drive Entertainment. It is available only on cassette (Elephant Records/Drive Entertainment).

Track listing
"Take Me Out to the Ballgame"
"Hokey Pokey"
"Oh Dear, What Can the Matter Be?"
"Pop! Goes the Weasel"
"The Farmer in the Dell"
"The Wheels on the Bus"
"Ha-Ha, This-A-Way"
"Eensy Weensy Spider"
"We're Gonna Shine"
"Turkey in the Straw"
"On A Picnic We Will Go"
"She'll Be Coming Round the Mountain"
"Pufferbellies"
"Ten in the Bed"
"Five Green Apples"
"The Muffin Man"
"Jelly, Jelly In My Belly"
"Five Little Monkeys"
"Grandpa's Farm"
"Jump Josie / Skip To My Loo"
"It's A Small World"

Songs 1,6,11,14,17 from Sharon, Lois & Bram's Elephant Show Record
Songs 2,9 from Stay Tuned, 
Songs 3,4,7,8,15,20 from Mainly Mother Goose, 
Song 5 from Happy Birthday, 
Songs 10,12,18 from One Elephant, Deux Éléphants, 
Songs 13,21 from In the Schoolyard, 
Song 16 from Singing 'n' Swinging, 
Song 19 from Sing A to Z.

Sharon, Lois & Bram albums
1993 compilation albums